Pambak is a village in the Vardenis Municipality of the Gegharkunik Province of Armenia. There are churches, a caravanserai, and cemeteries in the village. In 1988-1989 Armenian refugees from Azerbaijan settled in the village, including former inhabitants of Zaylik in Azerbaijan.

References

External links 
 
 

Populated places in Gegharkunik Province